The Vorotan Cascade, or the ContourGlobal™ Hydro Cascade, is a cascade on the Vorotan River in Syunik Province, Armenia. It was built to produce hydroelectric power and provide irrigation water.  The Vorotan Cascade consists of three hydroelectric power plants and five reservoirs with a combined installed capacity of 404.2 MW. It is one of the main power generation complexes in Armenia.

History 
The planning process of the Cascade began just after the Conference of the State Planning Commission held in 1951. In 1954, it was highlighted that with proper infrastructure and careful planning, Armenia's energetic hydro resources might allow it to become an electricity exporter to neighbouring energy deficit areas like Azerbaijan and Iran. It was anticipated that the activation of the Cascade would cut the import of oil products to the country by half. The design work of the Complex began in 1954 and it was constructed between 1961 and 1989. The Tatev hydroelectric power plant (HPP) was completed in December 1970, the Shamb HPP in 1978, and  the Spandaryan HPP] in 1989. Despite the plans, Azerbaijan was against the import of electricity from Armenia, thus hindering the scheduled renovation and capacity expansion to take place at the end of 1970's. The Vorotan Cascade continued to supply electricity mainly to non-ferrous metallurgy industry in nearby Agarak.

After Armenia gained independence, the Voratan Cascade belonged to the state-owned energy company Armenergo. In 1997, the Vorotan cascade was separated from Armenergo into a separate state owned company.

Modernization of the cascade started in 2003 by help of the €2.7 million grant of the European Union which was used for rehabilitation of the Tatev HPP of the Vorotan Cascade, and the Argel HPP.  Rehabilitation works were conducted by Voith Siemens Hydro Power Generation.  Next rehabilitation project was launched in 2010, financed by the €51 million credit from the German development bank KfW.  Rehabilitation works started in 2012.

In 2015, ContourGlobal purchased the Vorotan Cascade operating company for US$180 million.  ContourGlobal has started a six-year refurbishment program to modernize the plants and improve their operational performance, as well as safety, reliability, and efficiency, with the total investment of $70 million.  This is the biggest investment US investment in Armenia.  The International Finance Corporation, a member of the World Bank Group, did 20% of the total investment.

Specifications 

The Vorotan Cascade includes a system of three power plants which are Spandaryan, Shamb and Tatev, and five reservoirs which are Spandaryan, Angeghakot, Tolors, Tatev and a daily regulation reservoir.  The Spandaryan Reservoir in the vicinity of Tsghuk and Gorhayq villages, is the starting point of the complex. From there water flows through a pressurized tunnel to the Spandaryan HPP. From the Spandaryan HPP water flows to the Angeghakot Reservoir and continues its journey to the Tolors Reservoir which is located in the area of Sisian and Ayri. From that reservoir the water flows to the Shamb HPP. From Shamb reservoir that was constructed beyond the Shamb HPP water reaches the regulation pool, from where it proceeds to the Tatev HPP via a turbine pipe.

The Vorotan Cascade is one of the main power generation complexes in Armenia.  It provides both peak and base load power. It is used also for the grid stabilization.  The Tatev HPP has installed capacity of 157.2 MW, the Shamb HPP has installed capacity of 171 MW, and the Spandaryan HPP has installed capacity of 76 MW.  Total installed capacity of Vorotan Cascade is 404.2 MW and it generates 1.16 GWh of electricity annually.

The water stores of the Vorotan Complex are also used for irrigation in nearby village and town areas.

Power stations

Tatev HPP 
Power is generated by three Pelton turbines of  each. The plant is unique has it is the highest-head hydroelectric power plant in the territory of the former Soviet Union and by using Pelton turbines.

It includes also the daily regulation reservoir. The dam creates the Tatev Reservoir.

It is connected to the plant by a  pressure conduit, and to the  daily regulation reservoir by the sluice-feeder.

Shamb HPP

Shamb HPP includes the Angeghakot and Tolors dams which create the Angeghakot and Tolors reservoirs. Water runs from the Tolors Reservoir to the plant through a  diversion pressure tunnel which turns into a  single-lane penstock.

Spandaryan HPP
It is the upper hydroelectric power plant on the cascade commissioned in 1989. The plant has an installed capacity of 76 MW and a projected annual electricity generation of 210 GWh.

The Spandaryan Dam creates the cascade's upper reservoir, the Spandaryan Reservoir.

Its water intake infrastructures includes a pressure tunnel, a spillway culvert, and the Vorotan–Arpa tunnel for releasing water into Lake Sevan. The structures have ,  and  water outlays respectively. The last, the fourth structure is a surface spillway with a  installed capacity and inclining drop. The surge tank is connected to plant by  penstock.

Reservoirs

Spandaryan Reservoir

Spandaryan Reservoir is located southeast of Gorayk, in Spandaryan in the Vorotan River basin. It reportedly has a breeding colony of lesser kestrels, the only known in Armenia.

It has  active and  total capacities. The normal elevation of water level is  while  is the absolute minimum.

Angeghakot Reservoir

The Angeghakot Reservoir has  of total capacity.

Tolors reservoir
The normal elevation of water level is  while  is the minimum.

Tatev Reservoir
The normal elevation of water level is  while  is the minimum.

References

External links

Dams in Armenia
Hydroelectric power stations in Armenia
Gravity dams
Hydroelectric power stations built in the Soviet Union